Florian Roller (born 16 November 1992) is a German lightweight rower. He began rowing in 2004, and continued on to win a gold medal at the 2016 World Rowing Championships in Rotterdam with the lightweight men's quadruple scull. Roller finished first in the 2018 World Cup Rowing III and the 2018 World Rowing Championships. He lives in Markgröningen, Germany.

References

1992 births
Living people
German male rowers
World Rowing Championships medalists for Germany